Emil Neykov (born 1 August 2001) is a Bulgarian rower. He won the gold medal in the single scull at the 2021 European Rowing U23 Championships. The same year he also became World Champion for man under 23 years old. His parents Svilen Neykov and Rumyana Neykova are also successful rowers. In 2018. He successfully defeated a Serbian rower from RC Danubius 1885, Ivan Katić. Furthermore, in 2021 during European rowing championship (Poland) he defeated another Serbian rower from the same club Rastko Ratajac

References

External links 
 

2001 births
Living people
Bulgarian male rowers